The 36th Ariel Awards ceremony, organized by the Mexican Academy of Film Arts and Sciences (AMACC) took place on June 6, 1994, in Mexico City. During the ceremony, AMACC presented the Ariel Award in 24 categories honoring films released in 1993. Principio y Fin received seven awards out of 14 nominations, including Best Picture. Novia Que Te Vea followed with five awards; Ambar with four; and Desiertos Mares won two for Best Director and Best Original Story.

Winners and nominees
Winners are listed first and highlighted with boldface.

Special awards
Golden Ariel – Adalberto Martínez and Gregorio Walerstein
Salvador Toscano Medal – Gunther Gerzso
Special recognition – Gilberto Martínez Solares

Multiple nominations and awards

The following eleven films received multiple nominations:

Films that received multiple awards:

References

Ariel Awards ceremonies
1994 film awards
1994 in Mexico